Ernest John Uy Obiena (born November 17, 1995), also known as EJ Obiena, is a Filipino pole vaulter. Before breaking the Asian Athletics Championships record, he held the Philippine national record in pole vaulting with a record of 5.55 meters which he accomplished on April 29, 2016, at the 78th Singapore Open Championships in Kallang, Singapore. He later broke the Asian Athletics Championships record with 5.71 meters on April 21, 2019, on its 23rd biennial meet at Doha, Qatar which earned him the coveted gold medal finish. He currently holds the National Record which he broke in the same event.

Obiena is currently ranked as the world's third-best active men's pole vaulter, as per the World Athletics.

Obiena is the first Filipino that has been given a scholarship from the International Athletic Association Federation (IAAF).

Early life and education
Obiena was born to track and field athletes, Emerson Obiena and Jeanette Uy on November 17, 1995, in Tondo, Manila. He is of part Chinese descent. Obiena attended Chiang Kai Shek College for his secondary education and later entered the University of Santo Tomas for his college studies.

Pole vault career

Early years
EJ Obiena first took up pole vaulting when he was eight years old but he initially focused on doing hurdles. His father, Emerson Obiena served as his coach until he was 18 years old. Obiena competed at the 100 and 400 meter hurdles event for his high school, Chiang Kai Shek College. Unable to qualify for regional meets, He decided to shift back to pole vaulting when he was in his last years in high school in a bid to secure a college scholarship.

At the University Athletic Association of the Philippines (UAAP), he competed for the University of Santo Tomas.

National team

In early 2014, Obiena was able to meet Ukrainian pole vaulter Sergey Bubka who was visiting the Philippines. He originally intended just to get an autograph from Bubka but he was able to learn of an opportunity to train in Italy. In the same year for three months, Obiena went to Italy to train under coach Vitaly Petrov in Formia who also previously coached Bubka. On July 20, 2014, at the PATAFA weekly relays held at the PhilSports Football and Athletics Stadium, Obiena broke the national record for pole vault by registering 5.01 meters. The previous record was 5.0 meters by Edward Lasquete at the 1992 Summer Olympics in Barcelona, Spain. The junior national record was also broken, since Obiena at that time is 18 years old. The previous record was 4.31 set three years before.

He later broke his own record several times in 2014 alone (5.05, 5.05, 5.15, 5.20, 5.21). By the time Obiena became ineligible for the national junior record, the record was 5.21 which Obiena set himself.

In the 2015 Southeast Asian Games, Obiena won a silver medal with a leap of 5.25 meters, then his personal record.

Obiena won a gold medal in the 2016 Philippine National Games Finals in Lingayen, Pangasinan after breaking a new personal record (5.47 meters), despite problems with his broken pole.

Obiena won gold in the men's pole vault event at the 2019 Summer Universiade setting a new national record of 5.76 meters. He secured a berth in the 2020 Summer Olympics by surpassing the qualifying standard by making a 5.81 meters finish in a tournament in Chiara, Italy on September 3, 2019. The finish was also a national record.

At the 2019 World Athletics Championships he failed to advance to the final round by finishing 15th out of 35 entrants through his 5.6 meters finish. He is aiming to surpass his own record targeting to leap 5.85 meters or further in training.

The COVID-19 pandemic caused the postponement of the Olympics and travel restrictions imposed by countries in response to the health crisis posed logistical issues to Obiena's preparations. For most of 2020, Obiena spent his time training in Formia, Italy and was unable to go back to the Philippines during the Christmas season. He trained under American conditioning coach James Michael Lafferty and Nutritionist Carol Lafferty; along with Brazilian Thiago Braz as his training partner. Competing in 2020 Summer Olympics in Tokyo, Obiena managed to advance to the final of the pole vault competition but failed make a podium finish.

Obiena set a then Asian record in pole vault when he lifted his then best vault all the way to 5.93 meters at the International Golden Roof Challenge in Innsbruck, Austria on September 12, 2021. He finished 1st in the tournament. This record was later broken on July 25, 2022, when Obiena lifted his best vault all the way to 5.94 meters at the  World Athletics Championships in Oregon. He won a bronze medal, becoming the first Filipino to win a medal in the tournament.

Coaches 
Obiena has trained under coach Vitaly Petrov since 2014.  Obiena's coaching team includes his father, Emerson Obiena, mentor James Michael Lafferty, Physiotherapist Francesco Viscusi, Osteopath Antonio Guglietta, Nutrionist Carol Lafferty and Sport Psychologist Dr. Sheryll Casuga.

Dispute with PATAFA 

In November 2021, the Philippine Athletics Track and Field Association (PATAFA) publicly escalated an accounting dispute involving late payments to Obiena's coach, Vitaly Petrov. Petrov later denied there was any payment issue with Obiena. Philippine Senators quickly came to Obiena's defense, calling unproven accusations "harassment" against an athlete considered a national treasure and passing a motion to recall the budget of the PSC.  The Senators later approved the PSC budget with the condition that PATAFA will “rectify the grave injustice” done to Obiena's reputation.  During congressional hearings, witnesses testified that PATAFA's payment system is broken.

After an investigation by its Ethics Committee, the Philippine Olympic Committee (POC) declared PATAFA's president Philip Juico persona non grata for his role in the harassment of Obiena. The investigation of the POC's ethics committee concluded that Juico had harassed the athlete by making "malicious public accusations".

On March 30, 2022, the Philippine Sports Commission announced that both parties reached an agreement during a mediation process. Obiena will be endorsed by PATAFA in any future competitions.

Competition record

See also
 List of Asian Athletics Championships records
 List of Filipino records in athletics

References

External links
 

1995 births
Filipino male pole vaulters
Southeast Asian Games medalists in athletics
University Athletic Association of the Philippines players
University of Santo Tomas alumni
Living people
Southeast Asian Games silver medalists for the Philippines
Athletes (track and field) at the 2018 Asian Games
Competitors at the 2017 Southeast Asian Games
Asian Games competitors for the Philippines
People from Tondo, Manila
Competitors at the 2015 Southeast Asian Games
Competitors at the 2019 Southeast Asian Games
Southeast Asian Games gold medalists for the Philippines
Asian Athletics Championships winners
Universiade gold medalists in athletics (track and field)
Universiade medalists for the Philippines
Medalists at the 2019 Summer Universiade
Filipino expatriates in Italy
Athletes (track and field) at the 2020 Summer Olympics
Olympic track and field athletes of the Philippines
Competitors at the 2021 Southeast Asian Games
World Athletics Championships medalists
Filipino people of Chinese descent